Clouet is a surname. Notable people with the surname include:

 Jean Clouet (1480–1541), French Renaissance miniaturist and painter
 Jean-François Clouet (1751–1801), French metallurgist and chemist
 François Clouet ( 1510–1572), French Renaissance miniaturist and painter, son of Jean
 Michel Clouet (1770–1836), Canadian businessman and political figure